Rochetoirin is a commune in the Isère department in southeastern France.

Population

Twin towns
Rochetoirin is twinned with:

  Aspach-le-Haut, France

See also
Communes of the Isère department

References

Communes of Isère
Isère communes articles needing translation from French Wikipedia